Magic FM is a radio station based in Aba, the commercial city of Abia State. Established on May 15, 2013, the broadcaster transmits programs daily on 102.9 FM.

References 

Radio stations in Nigeria
Mass media in Nigeria
2013 establishments in Nigeria
Radio stations established in 2013